Kellen Alexander Goff (born February 3, 1995) is an American voice actor. He is most well known for his work in the video game franchise Five Nights at Freddy's, alongside his roles in My Hero Academia, JoJo's Bizarre Adventure: Golden Wind, Akudama Drive, Beastars, Attack on Titan, and Night Is Short, Walk On Girl.

Career
He began training in animation voiceover with Bob Bergen, as Bergen's youngest student at the time and the first minor to take his course. From there he went on to be taught by such names as Richard Horvitz, David Sobolov, Charlie Adler, Debi Derryberry, and Mick Wingert.

Goff provided his voice for a number of online animation and video game projects, slowly moving to more mainstream media as the years went on. In the fall of 2016, Goff joined the cast of Five Nights at Freddy's as the titular role of Funtime Freddy and Fredbear.

He has also cast ADR for multiple films, such as F the Prom, Traces, and Near Extinction: Shangri-La.

At a My Hero Academia panel at Anime Expo, Goff stated that he used his bronchitis to develop Overhaul's husky voice.

Personal life
Goff is autistic. He has stated that he is of Ashkenazi Jewish descent on both sides of his family. He declared himself demisexual in 2017 and as bisexual in 2021.

Filmography

Animation

Film

Video games

Web series

References

External links
 
 
 

1995 births
Living people
American male video game actors
American male voice actors
Actors from Torrance, California
21st-century American male actors
Male actors from California
Actors with autism
Jewish American male actors
American Ashkenazi Jews
LGBT Jews
LGBT people from California
Bisexual male actors
21st-century American Jews
American bisexual actors
Demisexual people